SM or sm may refer to:

Business and economics 
 Service mark symbol
 Spesmilo ₷, a former international currency
 Senior management

Organizations
 SM Entertainment, South Korean music label
 SM Prime, a Philippine retail operator
 SM Supermalls, Philippine chain of shopping malls
 SM-liiga, top Finnish men's ice hockey league
 SM-sarja, Finnish former top men's ice hockey league
 Syndicat de la Magistrature, a French union
 St. Mark's School, New England private high school
 St. Mark's School of Texas, a private school in Dallas

Places 
 SM postcode area, Greater London, England
 San Marino, ISO country code
 Satu Mare, Romania, vehicle registration

Science

Biology and medicine
 "Sm.", author abbreviation for "Smith", see List of taxonomic authorities named Smith
 S.M. (patient), a patient with brain damage
 James Edward Smith (botanist) (1759–1828), botanist cited as "Sm."

Computing
 .sm, San Marino top-level Internet domain
 SM EVM, Soviet computers, e.g. SM-4

Physics and chemistry
 Samarium, symbol Sm, a chemical element
 Standard Model, a descriptive theory of particle physics

Other sciences
 Magellanic spiral, a galaxy class
 Selective mutism, an anxiety disorder

Titles, ranks, and awards

Military
 Sacrifice Medal, Canada
 Sena Medal, India
 Service member, a member of a branch of the military
 Southern Cross Medal (1952), South Africa
 Southern Cross Medal (1975), South Africa

Other titles, ranks, and awards
 Medal of Service of the Order of Canada, post-nominal letters
 Scientiæ Magister or Master of Science
 Studio manager, in media professions
 Suomen mestaruus (Finnish Champion), sports award 
 Swedish Championship (disambiguation) (Swedish Champion), sports award

Transportation and other moving vehicles
 Citroën SM, an automobile model
 Prefix of some Savoia-Marchetti aircraft, e.g. SM.83
 Shanghai Metro
 SM (motorcycle), defunct Polish motorcycle manufacturer 
 SM-class minesweeper, a ship class of the Finnish Navy
 Spec Miata, a class of racing car
 Spirit of Manila Airlines, IATA airline code
 St. Mary's Railroad, reporting mark
 Standard Missile, a family of US missiles, e.g. SM-3
 Swedline Express, former IATA airline code.

Other uses 
 Sadomasochism (SM, S/M or S&M)
 Samoan language (ISO 639-1 code sm)
 Stephen Malkmus (born 1966), singer of Pavement
 Supplementary Member in a democratic voting system
 Society of Mary (Marianists), Roman Catholic congregation
 Silvano Melea Otieno, the controversy around his burial was called "Burying SM"
 SM radar, an American made fighter-direction radar used during World War II

See also 
 S&M (disambiguation)